Juma Al-Rahbi (born 1949) is an Omani sport shooter. He competed in the 1984 Summer Olympics.

References

1949 births
Living people
Shooters at the 1984 Summer Olympics
Omani male sport shooters
Olympic shooters of Oman
Shooters at the 1994 Asian Games
Asian Games competitors for Oman
20th-century Omani people